The Onive River is a river in eastern Madagascar.  It flows down from the Ankaratra massif, and is the largest tributary of the Mangoro River.

Notable waterfalls, with a 30m vertical drop, are located southwest of the village of Tsinjoarivo.

References

Rivers of Madagascar